Mantzaris is a Greek surname. Notable people with the surname include:

Antonis Mantzaris (born 1986), Greek basketball player
Diane Mantzaris (born 1962), Australian artist
Vangelis Mantzaris (born 1990), Greek basketball player

Greek-language surnames
Surnames